Darren Modoo (born 21 May 1998), is a Grenadian professional footballer who currently plays for GFA Premier Division side Paradise FC.

International career
Modoo made his international debut on 29 April 2017, replacing Jamal Charles in the 70th minute.

Athletics career
As well as football, Modoo also competes in athletics, and has represented Grenada in javelin at the 2016 CARIFTA Games.

Career statistics

International

References

External links
 
 Darren Modoo at Caribbean Football Database

1998 births
Living people
Association football forwards
Grenadian footballers
Grenada international footballers